Villa San Giovanni railway station is the main railway station serving the town and comune of Villa San Giovanni, in the region of Calabria, southern Italy. It opened in 1884, and it forms part of the Battipaglia–Reggio di Calabria railway.

The station is currently managed by Rete Ferroviaria Italiana (RFI). However, the commercial area of the passenger building is managed by Centostazioni. The station's main line train services are operated by or on behalf of Trenitalia. Each of these companies is a subsidiary of Ferrovie dello Stato (FS), Italy's state-owned rail company.

As the main point of arrival and departure of rail passengers between the mainland and Sicily, the station is a rail facility of national importance.  In terms of passenger movements, it is the second busiest station in the Reggio Calabria urban area, and one of the busiest in the region.  Additionally, it is a transit point for all of the goods transported by rail between the mainland and Sicily.

Location
Villa San Giovanni railway station is situated at Piazza Stazione, at the western edge of the town centre. It occupies Villa San Giovanni's waterfront area, between the town centre and the ferry terminal for ferries to Sicily.

History

Soon afterwards, the construction company, the Società Vittorio Emanuele, handed over the facility to the new Società per le Strade Ferrate del Mediterraneo. The latter company eventually completed the Southern Tyrrhenian railway in 1895. In that year, the importance of the station grew significantly, because for travellers coming from Sicily it was more convenient to take a ferry straight to Villa San Giovanni than to travel, as before, via the port of Reggio Calabria.
On 1 March 1905, the station was connected by a new short railway with the Villa ferry port. This development facilitated the introduction of ferry services carrying railway rolling stock.

As time went on, the importance of Villa San Giovanni gradually increased, to the detriment of Reggio Calabria, as the Tyrrhenian rail route to central and northern Italy was shorter than the alternative route via the Jonica railway. Movement of rail traffic across the Strait of Messina was also increased and strengthened by the introduction of Villesi cradles. The passenger building was built in 1937, as a project of architect Roberto Narducci.

Train services
The station is served by the following service(s):

High speed services (Frecciargento) Rome - Naples - Salerno - Lamezia Terme - Reggio di Calabria
Intercity services Rome - Naples - Salerno - Lamezia Terme - Messina - Palermo
Intercity services Rome - Naples - Salerno - Lamezia Terme - Messina - Siracusa
Intercity services Rome - Naples - Salerno - Lamezia Terme - Reggio di Calabria
Night train (Intercity Notte) Rome - Naples - Messina - Siracusa
Night train (Intercity Notte) Milan - Messina - Siracusa
Night train (Intercity Notte) Turin - Reggio di Calabria
Regional services (Treno regionale) Cosenza - Lamezia Terme - Rosarno - Villa San Giovanni - Reggio di Calabria
Metropolitan services (Treno regionale) Rosarno - Villa San Giovanni - Reggio di Calabria - Melito di Porto Salvo

Features
Six tracks at the station are used for passenger services. The goods yard is very large, and its sidings are arranged into three distinct groups.

Interchange
The station has a bus terminus for ATAM and Costa Viola buses.  It also offers interchange with ferries to Sicily.

Images

See also

Reggio Calabria Centrale railway station
History of rail transport in Italy
List of railway stations in Calabria
Rail transport in Italy
Railway stations in Italy

References

External links

This article is based upon a translation of the Italian language version as at January 2011.

Buildings and structures in the Province of Reggio Calabria
Railway stations in Calabria
Railway stations opened in 1884